Sir Bernard Nathaniel Waley-Cohen, 1st Baronet (29 May 1914 – 3 July 1991) was a British businessman. He was the 633rd Lord Mayor of London, elected in 1960.

Biography

The son of Sir Robert Waley Cohen and Alice (née Beddington), Waley-Cohen was educated at Clifton College where he was a member of Polack's House. He was an Alderman City of London for Portsoken Ward, 1949–84; Sheriff of London, 1955–56; Lord Mayor of London, 1960–61; one of the Lieutenants, City of London, 1949–1991. He was a director of the Palestine Corporation, founded in 1922 by a number British businessmen to promote economic development in the British mandate of Palestine. Waley-Cohen was a member of the College Committee of University College London, 1953–80.  He was Treasurer 1962–70, Vice-Chairman 1970 and Chairman, 1971–80.  In former times, as Alderman, he sometimes sat as sole Justice in the Mansion House Justice Room.

He was made a Knight Bachelor in 1957 and made a Baronet of Honeymead in the County of Somerset, in 1961.

Waley-Cohen married the Hon. Joyce Constance Ina, daughter of Harry Nathan, 1st Baron Nathan (1920–2013). They had four children:
 Rosalind Burdon (married to businessman and former New Zealand politician and Cabinet Minister, Hon Philip Burdon)
 Sir Stephen Waley-Cohen
 Joanna Waley-Cohen 
 Robert Waley-Cohen

Their grandson (son of Robert) is the amateur jockey Sam Waley-Cohen who won the 2022 Grand National riding Noble Yeats. A 50/1 odds outsider, it was described as a fairytale win.

Arms

References 

Knights Bachelor
English Jews
Jewish British politicians
Sheriffs of the City of London
20th-century lord mayors of London
20th-century English politicians
People associated with University College London
Waley-Cohen, Bernard, 1st Baronet
People educated at Clifton College
1914 births
1991 deaths
Waley-Cohen, Bernard, 1st Baronet
Masters of foxhounds in England
Burials at Willesden Jewish Cemetery
Waley-Cohen family